Al-Fayhaa Sport Club is an Iraqi football team based in Basra, that plays in Iraq Division Two.

Managerial history

  Fahad Jamil

See also 
 2021–22 Iraq Division Two

References

External links
 Iraq Clubs- Foundation Dates
 Basra Clubs Union

Football clubs in Iraq
2016 establishments in Iraq
Association football clubs established in 2016
Football clubs in Basra
Basra